Gonzato is a surname. Notable people with the surname include:

Bruno Gonzato (born 1944), Italian track cyclist

See also
Gonzalo (name)

Surnames